Alpha Chi Alpha is a fraternity at the American Ivy League university of Dartmouth College. Alpha Chi Alpha is a member of Dartmouth's Greek system, which currently has fourteen fraternities, nine sororities and three co-ed undergraduate houses that fall under the umbrella of the Greek system.

Alpha Chi Alpha is referred to among Dartmouth students as simply Alpha Chi.

The house, which is located at 13 Webster Avenue on the Dartmouth College campus, is a college-owned fraternity, meaning that the brothers do not own the land or house. This also means that Dartmouth College paid for $1.3 million in renovations (done during the summer of 2004), which included the razing of the "Barn" structure that was used as social space by the brothers of Alpha Chi to make way for a new expanded basement and main floor area which were to act as a new social space for the fraternity.

The house is nicknamed the "Magic Green Cottage" and the "Cheese Lodge" by its members and has the unique location on fraternity row directly across from the President's house. The green-shingled structure includes a sand volleyball court adjacent to the house. Its perennial pledges are easily recognized by their "sirens" (red, baseball cap-like headwear), which they wear for the duration of their pledge term.

The house was begun in March 1917, when twelve Dartmouth men founded the Epsilon Kappa Alpha fraternity. In 1919, this lodge became the Phi Nu chapter of the national fraternity, Alpha Chi Rho. The house was located in the back of the present White Church.

Alpha Chi Rho flourished at Dartmouth for about ten years. In the early 1930s, however, the number of brothers declined drastically due to a number of new fraternities on campus and general financial difficulties caused by the Depression. It was at that time when Alpha Chi Rho, along with Lambda Chi Alpha, Phi Kappa Sigma, and Alpha Sigma Phi, who were each having difficulties of their own, joined together to create a new fraternity, Gamma Delta Chi. This house is still active today.

House history

On March 9, 1957, twenty-four undergraduates bonded together and broke away from Gamma Delta Chi, which they thought was inadequate and misdirected. They reactivated the Phi Nu chapter of Alpha Chi Rho. The brotherhood moved to the present house on Webster Avenue, bought and repaired by the College. In this way, the fraternity was established. Tim Ryerson '59 was the first President of the reactivated chapter.

Early in the spring of 1963, a committee met and recommended a break from the national. On May 21, 1963, the chapter voted to discontinue their ties with the national affiliation. It was determined that the brotherhood had no meaningful ties with the national. The national chapter required brothers to "accept Jesus as their lord and savior," a tenet that brothers at the Dartmouth chapter strongly disagreed with. The ritual was meaningless to the brothers because of their general dislike for the national, and because they found such a requirement to be ridiculous.  An overburdening financial obligation to the national may have been an additional consideration. The brotherhood voted to name the disaffiliated fraternity Alpha Chi Alpha and it has been in continual operation ever since.

13 Webster Avenue

The building was built in 1898. Professor Fred Emery purchased the vacant lot on May 5, 1896. Later owners sold the house to the college in March 1957, and it has been leased by the brotherhood ever since. The College, as the fraternity's landlord, takes care of all major structural repairs.

Improvements have been made on the building from term to term, including a series of major renovations. The living room and the second floor above it were added in May 1963. The entire third floor is the result of the efforts of Bob Ceplikas '78. During the summer of 1985, the College spent over $180,000 on major renovations.

The most recent renovations occurred in the summer and fall terms of 2004. Costing $1.3 million, the renovations involved the razing of a structure that was once known as the 'Emory Barn,' but soon referred to as simply 'the Barn'. A concrete hallway, called 'the Slide,' was constructed at some point, adjoining the fraternity's physical plant and the Barn. The Barn was one of the most distinctive social atmospheres on Dartmouth's campus and cherished by the brotherhood. The second floor of the Barn, known as the Upstairs Barn, housed three brothers each term, and it became well known among the brotherhood as a unique melting-pot bonding experience. The basement, along with the new main floor area and recently refurbished tube room, have replaced the Barn and the old front room as the primary social spaces for the fraternity. Presently, since construction was completed in fall 2004, the newest reincarnation of Alpha Chi Alpha is able to house 21 brothers and host over 600 guests for the Beach Party that the brothers put on each winter during Winter Carnival, and also for a Pigstick BBQ each spring on the first Saturday in May.

Notable alumni
Jim Coulter, co-founder of private equity firm TPG Capital
 John Hoeven, senior United States senator from North Dakota, former governor of North Dakota
Christopher Miller, co-director of Cloudy with a Chance of Meatballs, 21 Jump Street, The Lego Movie, and 22 Jump Street
Jake Tapper, chief Washington D.C. correspondent and daily news anchor for CNN

See also
List of social fraternities and sororities

References

External links
Alpha Chi Alpha's Homepage
Dartmouth's Homepage
Dartmouth's Inter-fraternity Council
Dartmouth's Campus Newspaper

Dartmouth College Greek organizations
Fraternities and sororities in the United States
Local fraternities and sororities
Student organizations established in 1963
1963 establishments in New Hampshire